Andrud is a small village in Phaltan, Satara district, Maharashtra, India. Postal index number 415523. The majority of the population is involved in agriculture, and working as drivers and doing physical works in Mumbai and Pune. Previously onion was major cash crop. this village is usually hit by draught every year

Villages in Satara district